The 1968 United States Senate election in Kansas took place on November 5, 1968, concurrently with the U.S. presidential election as well as other elections to the United States Senate in other states as well as elections to the United States House of Representatives and various state and local elections.

Incumbent Republican U.S. Senator Frank Carlson did not run for re-election.

Republican nominee Bob Dole defeated Democratic nominee William I. Robinson with 60.08% of the vote.

Primary elections 
Primary elections were held on August 6, 1968.

Democratic primary

Candidates 
Irene Corn
James Kenneth Logan, dean of the University of Kansas School of Law
George A. Lopez, employee of a meat packing plant
William I. Robinson, attorney, Democratic nominee for Kansas's 4th congressional district in 1960
K. L. "Ken" Smith, Democratic nominee for U.S. Senate in 1962

Results

Republican primary

Candidates 
William H. Avery, former Governor of Kansas
Bob Dole, incumbent U.S. Representative for Kansas's 1st congressional district

Results

General election

Candidates 
Bob Dole (R)
William I. Robinson (D)
Joseph Fred Hyskell (P)

Results

See also 
 1968 United States Senate elections

References

Bibliography
 
 

1968
Kansas
United States Senate
Bob Dole